17α-Ethynyl-3α-androstanediol (developmental code names HE-3235, Apoptone), also known as 17α-ethynyl-5α-androstane-3α,17β-diol, is a synthetic androstane steroid and a 17α-substituted derivative of 3α-androstanediol which was never marketed. It was under development for the treatment of prostate cancer but was discontinued.

It produces 5α-dihydroethisterone (5α-dihydro-17α-ethynyltestosterone), a ligand of several steroid hormone receptors, and 17α-ethynyl-3β-androstanediol, an estrogen, as active metabolites. These metabolites may contribute importantly to the biological activity of 17α-ethynyl-3α-androstanediol, with 17α-ethynyl-3α-androstanediol potentially serving as a prodrug.

Analogues of 17α-ethynyl-3α-androstanediol include 17α-ethynyl-3β-androstanediol, ethinylandrostenediol (17α-ethynyl-5-androstenediol), ethandrostate (17α-ethynyl-5-androstenediol 3β-cyclohexanepropionate), ethinylestradiol (17α-ethynylestradiol), ethisterone (17α-ethynyltestosterone), and 5α-dihydroethisterone (17α-ethynyldihydrotestosterone).

References

5α-Reduced steroid metabolites
Abandoned drugs
Ethynyl compounds
Androgens and anabolic steroids
Androstanes
Antigonadotropins
Diols
Experimental cancer drugs
Prodrugs
Synthetic estrogens